Maria Ferekidi (born 2 December 1981 in Athens) is a Greek slalom canoeist who has competed since the early 2000s. At the 2004 Summer Olympics in Athens, she was eliminated in the qualifying round of the K-1 event, finishing in 17th place. Four years later in Beijing, Ferekidi was eliminated in the semifinals of the same event where she was classified in 11th place.

References
Sports-Reference.com profile

1981 births
Canoeists at the 2004 Summer Olympics
Canoeists at the 2008 Summer Olympics
Greek female canoeists
Living people
Olympic canoeists of Greece
Sportspeople from Athens